Dr. John's Gumbo released in 1972 is the fifth album by New Orleans singer and pianist Dr. John, a tribute to the music of his native city.  The album is a collection of covers of New Orleans classics, played by a major figure in the city's music. It marked the beginning of Dr. John's transition away from the eccentric stage character that earned him a cult following, and toward a more straightforward image based on New Orleans' R&B traditions.

In 2012, the album was ranked number 404 on Rolling Stone magazine's list of the 500 greatest albums of all time. The album cover was shot in front of the huge mural adorning the wall of The Farmer John Company (also seen in the movie Carrie), located at Soto Street and Vernon in Vernon, California. The album was on the Billboard 200 charts for eleven weeks, charting as high as #112 on June 24, 1972.

Track listing
"Iko Iko" (James "Sugar Boy" Crawford) – 4:08
"Blow Wind Blow" (Huey "Piano" Smith, Izzy Cougarden) – 3:17
"Big Chief" (Earl King) – 3:25
"Somebody Changed the Lock" (Mac Rebennack) – 2:42
"Mess Around" (Ahmet Ertegun) – 3:09
"Let the Good Times Roll" (Earl King) – 3:56
"Junko Partner" (Bob Shad) – 4:27
"Stack-A-Lee" (Traditional; arranged by Leon T. Gross (Archibald)) – 3:28
"Tipitina" (Professor Longhair) – 2:04
"Those Lonely Lonely Nights" (Earl King, Johnny Vincent) – 2:30
"Huey Smith Medley" (Huey "Piano" Smith, Johnny Vincent) – 3:17
"High Blood Pressure"
"Don't You Just Know It"
"Well I'll Be John Brown"
"Little Liza Jane" (Huey "Piano" Smith, Johnny Vincent) – 2:59

"Thanks to Peter Wolf of the J. Geils Band for the suggestion to cut 'Iko Iko

Personnel
 Dr. John – guitar on "Let the Good Times Roll"; piano, cornet, vocals
 Lee Allen – tenor saxophone
 Ronnie Barron – organ, electric piano, backing vocals; piano on "Let the Good Times Roll"
 Harold Battiste – clarinet on "Somebody Changed the Lock"; saxophone, vocal and horn arrangements
 Moe Bechamin – saxophone, backing vocals
 Jimmy Calhoun – bass
 Sidney George – harmonica on "Let the Good Times Roll"; saxophone
 Shirley Goodman, Tami Lynn, Robbie Montgomery, Jessica Smith – backing vocals
 Ken Klimak – guitar
 Dave Lastie – saxophone
 Melvin Lastie – trumpet, cornet
 John Ewing – trombone
 Alvin Robinson – guitar, backing vocals
 Freddie Staehle – drums, percussion
 Richard "Didimus" Washington – percussion
Technical
 Harold Battiste – producer
 Jerry Wexler – producer
 Keith Olsen, Gary Brandt – engineer
 Tom Wilkes – design, photography
 Barry Feinstein – design, photography

References

1972 albums
Dr. John albums
Albums produced by Jerry Wexler
Albums produced by Harold Battiste
Atco Records albums
Albums recorded at Sound City Studios
Rhythm and blues albums by American artists
Rock-and-roll albums